Megachile orientalis is a species of bee in the family Megachilidae. It was described by Morawitz in 1895.

References

Orientalis
Insects described in 1895